The 2013 St Kilda Football Club season was the 117th in the club's history. Coached by Scott Watters and captained by Nick Riewoldt, they competed in the AFL's 2013 Toyota Premiership Season.

Season summary

Pre-season

Regular season

Standings

References

External links
 
 Listing of St Kilda game results in 2013

St Kilda Football Club seasons